Bhishma Narain Singh Law College or BNS Law College is a private law school situated at Redma, Medininagar in the Indian state of Jharkhand. The college offers three-years B.A., LL.B. course approved by the Bar Council of India (BCI), New Delhi and affiliated to Nilamber Pitamber University.

History
The college was named after former Governor Bhishma Narain Singh. It was established in 1981 by the Bhishma Narain Singh welfare and charitable Trust. Bhishma Narain Singh Law College was initially affiliated to Ranchi University and thereafter came under the affiliation of the Nilamber Pitamber University of Daltonganj.

See also

References

External links
Official Website
Nilamber-Pitamber University

Law schools in Jharkhand
Universities and colleges in Jharkhand
Educational institutions established in 1981
1981 establishments in Bihar